Ghost Culture is the debut studio album released by electronic musician James Greenwood under the name Ghost Culture. It was released on 12 January 2015 through Phantasy Sound, distributed through Because Music. Greenwood stated that his album was influenced by David Bowie's "Ziggy Stardust and the Spiders From Mars", "Construction Time Again" by Depeche Mode and "Fear of Music" by Talking Heads.
Upon release, it reached No. 20 on the Independent Album Breakers chart. It was released to largely favourable reviews. The album was selected as Rough Trade record of the month in January 2015.

Track listing

References

External links 
 

2015 debut albums
Phantasy (record label) albums